Subhashgram is a neighbourhood in the Rajpur Sonarpur of the South 24 Parganas district in the Indian state of West Bengal. It is a part of the area covered by the Kolkata Metropolitan Development Authority (KMDA).

History

The ancestral houses of Sarat Chandra Bose and Subhash Chandra Bose were at Kodalia. Both of them were members of the first 24 Parganas District Committee of the Congress Party, which was formed in 1921.

Geography

Area overview
Baruipur subdivision is a rural subdivision with moderate levels of urbanization. 31.05% of the population live in the urban areas and 68.95% live in the rural areas. In the northern portion of the subdivision (shown in the map alongside) there are 10 census towns. The entire district is situated in the Ganges Delta and the northern  part of the subdivision is a flat plain bordering the metropolis of Kolkata.

Note: The map alongside presents some of the notable locations in the subdivision. All places marked in the map are linked in the larger full screen map.

Location

Transport
Subhashgram is on the State Highway 1.

Subhashgram railway station is on the Sealdah–Namkhana line of the Kolkata Suburban Railway system.

Commuters
With the electrification of the railways, suburban traffic has grown tremendously since the 1960s. As of 2005-06, more than 1.7 million (17 lakhs) commuters use the Kolkata Suburban Railway system daily. After the partition of India, refugees from erstwhile East Pakistan and Bangladesh had a strong impact on the development of urban areas in the periphery of Kolkata. The new immigrants depended on Kolkata for their livelihood, thus increasing the number of commuters. Eastern Railway runs 1,272 EMU trains daily.

Education
Subhashgram Nabatara Vidyalaya Up High School is a Bengali-medium coeducational school. It was established in 1986 and has facilities for teaching from class V to class XII.

Healthcare
Sonarpur Rural Hospital, with 25 beds, at Rajpur Sonarpur, is the major government medical facility in the Sonarpur CD block.

References

External links
 
 Ancestral House of Subhas Chandra Bose

Cities and towns in South 24 Parganas district
Neighbourhoods in Kolkata
Kolkata Metropolitan Area